Kimani Press was formed by Harlequin Enterprises, Ltd. in December 2005, with the purchase of the Arabesque, Sepia, and New Spirit Imprints from BET Books. Arabesque was the first line of original African-American romance novels from a major publishing house, and published two single-titles each month until it ceased publication in February 2015. The Sepia imprint featured commercial women’s fiction, and New Spirit served the growing African-American inspirational marketplace with both fiction and non-fiction releases.

In July 2006, Harlequin launched Kimani Romance, the only African-American series imprint in the marketplace today, with four new releases each month. In May 2017, it was announced that Harlequin was no longer acquiring titles for the Kimani Romance imprint, with the final titles due to be released in 2018.

In February 2007, Kimani TRU was launched targeting a young-adult, multi-cultural audience with one new release each month. This line ceased publication in October 2014.

Since 2005, Kimani Press novels have been available in eBook format, a portable downloaded alternative to the standard paperback.

Kimani Press imprints

The name 'KIMANI' is of Kikuyu Origin.

Arabesque: The leading line of African-American romances. An-award-winning imprint of traditional and contemporary romance novels written by African-American authors. The last title was released in February 2015. 

Kimani Romance: Series romance. The last title will be released in 2018.

Kimani Tru: Young-adult fiction featuring African-American youth. The last title was released in October 2014.

Kimani Press Special Releases :  Special Releases from favorite Kimani Press authors. The last title was released in January 2015.

References

External links
 www.eHarlequin.com—for information about Kimani Press print and digital books, authors, writer’s guidelines, and submissions.

Book publishing companies of Canada
Romance book publishing companies
African-American literature
Literature by African-American women